Cao Mojie (born 10 April 1992) is a Chinese long distance runner. She competed in the women's marathon at the 2017 World Championships in Athletics.

References

External links

1992 births
Living people
Chinese female marathon runners
World Athletics Championships athletes for China
Place of birth missing (living people)